= Kokura D.C. Tower =

Skyscraper in Kitakyūshū, Fukuoka Prefecture, Japan

Coordinates: 33°53′13″N 130°52′28″E

The Kokura D.C. Tower (小倉D.C.タワー, Kokura Dii Shii Tawaa) is a skyscraper located in Kitakyūshū, Fukuoka Prefecture, Japan. Construction of the 145 metres (476 ft) skyscraper was finished in 2008. The 41-story building has a total floor area of 32,641 square metres (351,340 sq ft).
